Koura may refer to:

 Koura District, or El-Koura, a district in North Lebanon
 , a village in Lawdar District of the Abyan Governorate, Yemen
 New Zealand freshwater crayfish known as koura, see Paranephrops